

See also 

 Cuban American literature
 List of Cuban writers
 List of Cuban women writers
 List of Cuban Americans
 Before Columbus Foundation

References

Bibliography
  (Anthology; includes writer biographies)
  (Anthology; includes writer biographies)
 
  
  

 List
Cuban
 List